The 2021 Andalucía Challenger was a professional tennis tournament played on clay courts. It was the fourth edition of the tournament which was part of the 2021 ATP Challenger Tour. It took place in Marbella, Spain between 29 March and 3 April 2021.

Singles main-draw entrants

Seeds

 1 Rankings are as of 23 March 2021.

Other entrants
The following players received wildcards into the singles main draw:
  Leo Borg
  Carlos Gimeno Valero
  Carlos Gómez-Herrera

The following player received entry into the singles main draw using a protected ranking:
  Andrey Kuznetsov

The following players received entry into the singles main draw as alternates:
  Maxime Janvier
  Mario Vilella Martínez
  Elias Ymer

The following players received entry from the qualifying draw:
  Javier Barranco Cosano
  Vít Kopřiva
  Nikolás Sánchez Izquierdo
  Carlos Sánchez Jover

Champions

Singles

  Gianluca Mager def.  Jaume Munar 2–6, 6–3, 6–2.

Doubles

  Dominic Inglot /  Matt Reid def.  Romain Arneodo /  Hugo Nys 1–6, 6–3, [10–6].

References

Andalucía Challenger
2021 in Spanish tennis
March 2021 sports events in Spain
April 2021 sports events in Spain